Marzikola (also Romanized as Marzīkolā, Marzī Kolā, and Marzī Kalā) is a city and capital of Babol Kenar District, Babol County, Mazandaran Province, Iran.  At the 2006 census, its population was 525, in 141 families.

References

Populated places in Babol County

Cities in Mazandaran Province